Edwardsiella may refer to:
 Edwardsiella (bacterium), a genus of bacteria
 Edwardsiella (sea anemone), a genus of sea anemones